The Irupu Falls   (also Iruppu Falls)  are located in the Brahmagiri Range in the Kodagu district of Karnataka, India, bordering the Wayanad district of Kerala. It is a fresh water cascade and is situated at a distance of 48 km from Virajpet on the highway to Nagarhole. The Falls are also known as the Lakshmana Tirtha Falls, derived from the name of the tributary of Cauvery which starts from these falls, the Lakshmana Tirtha River.

A forest trail leads from these falls to the Brahmagiri Peak in Southern Kodagu. Irupu falls is a major tourist attraction as well as a pilgrimage spot. A famous Shiva temple, the Rameshwara Temple is situated on the banks of the Lakshmana Tirtha River, en route to the Falls. This temple attracts many pilgrims during the festival of Shivaratri.

The legend 

According to popular legend, Rama and Lakshmana, passed along the Bhramagiri range whilst searching for Rama's beloved, Sita. When Rama asked Lakshmana to fetch him drinking water, Lakshmana shot an arrow into the Brahmagiri hills and brought into being the river Lakshmana Tirtha. Due to this legend, the Falls is believed to possess the power to cleanse sins and is visited by thousands of devotees on Shivaratri day.

How to reach 

The best time to visit the Falls is during the monsoons, when the Falls is at full capacity and is a breathtaking sight. Irupu is situated at 48 km from Virajpet, 260 km from Bangalore, 240 km from Mangalore and 120 km from Mysore. The Falls can be visited by the highway from Gonikopal to Nagerhole National Park off the Kutta Road after Srimangala.

By air
Nearest is the Kannur International Airport (101 KM) through Western Ghats
Mysore Airport (113 KM) may also be used to reach the Falls

Other places of interest 
 Abbey Falls
 Jog Falls

See also 
 List of waterfalls in India

References

External links 

Waterfalls of Karnataka
Tourist attractions in Kodagu district
Geography of Kodagu district
Waterfalls of India